Luca Zanon (born 4 July 1996) is an Italian football player. He plays for Aglianese.

Club career
He made his Serie B debut for Virtus Entella on 22 September 2015 in a game against Cagliari.

On 22 July 2019, Zanon signed a two-year contract with Pordenone.

On 11 September 2021, he moved to Aglianese in Serie D.

References

External links
 

1996 births
People from Camposampiero
Footballers from Veneto
Living people
Italian footballers
Association football defenders
Italy youth international footballers
ACF Fiorentina players
Virtus Entella players
U.S. Pistoiese 1921 players
Ternana Calcio players
A.C.N. Siena 1904 players
Pordenone Calcio players
Aglianese Calcio 1923 players
Serie B players
Serie C players
Serie D players
Sportspeople from the Province of Padua